The 1947 BAA draft was the 1st draft of the Basketball Association of America (BAA), which later became the National Basketball Association (NBA). The fledgling BAA held a joint draft with the established National Basketball League (NBL). Both leagues wanted to control salaries by stamping out competitive bidding by assigning exclusive rights to the team selecting a player. The NBL had already signed 11 players, whom they did not feel should be exposed to the draft. The players included college stars Jack Smiley, Ralph Hamilton, Harry Boykoff, John Hargis, Frank Brian, and Charlie Black.  As a trade-off, the BAA teams were allowed to select players before the NBL. 

The draft was held on July 1, 1947, before the 1947–48 season. The nine remaining BAA teams along with the Baltimore Bullets who joined from the American Basketball League, took turns selecting amateur U.S. college basketball players. In the first round of the draft, the teams selected in reverse order of their win–loss record in the previous season, while the Bullets were assigned the tenth pick, the last pick of the first round. Both the Pittsburgh Ironmen and Toronto Huskies participated in this draft, but they folded before the season opened.

Draft selections and draftee career notes
The first selection of the draft, Clifton McNeely from Texas Wesleyan University, did not play in the BAA. Instead, McNeely opted for a high school coaching career in Texas. The fourth pick, Walt Dropo, also did not play in the BAA and opted for a professional baseball career instead, eventually playing 13 seasons in the Major League Baseball (MLB). The 7th and 10th picks, Jack Underman and Larry Killick, also never played in the BAA. Three players from this draft, Harry Gallatin, Andy Phillip and Jim Pollard, have been inducted to the Basketball Hall of Fame.

Wataru Misaka, selected by the New York Knicks, made the team's final roster and became the first person of color to play in modern professional basketball, just months after the Major League Baseball color line had been broken by the Brooklyn Dodgers' Jackie Robinson. Misaka was cut after playing only three games with the team.

Key

Draft

Other picks
The following list includes other draft picks who have appeared in at least one BAA/NBA game.

Notable undrafted players
These players were not selected in the 1947 draft, but played at least one game in the NBA.

Notes

See also
 List of first overall NBA draft picks

References
General

Specific

External links
NBA.com
NBA.com: NBA Draft History

Draft
Basketball Association of America draft
BAA draft
BAA draft
BAA draft
Basketball in Detroit
Events in Detroit